Amara glacialis is a species of seed-eating ground beetle in the subfamily Carabinae. It is found in Siberia and North America.

References

Further reading

 
 
 

glacialis
Beetles described in 1853
Taxa named by Carl Gustaf Mannerheim (naturalist)